Ahuntsic (French pronunciation ) is a district in the northern part of Montreal, Quebec, Canada. Originally an independent village, Ahuntsic was first annexed by Montreal in 1910, then merged into the borough of Ahuntsic-Cartierville in 2002.

It is home to Collège Ahuntsic and Complexe sportif Claude-Robillard.

History
The municipality of the Village of Ahuntsic was founded on January 21, 1897, by a proclamation of the Quebec provincial government. The council of the new village operated until 1910, when the province passed laws creating the charter of the City of Montreal. It was then annexed and later combined with Nouveau-Bordeaux, forming the district of Ahuntsic-Bordeaux. The city of Cartierville and Sault-au-Récollet were added in 1918.

In 1952, following a land exchange, Ahuntsic took over part of Saint-Laurent. During the municipal merger-demerger under Bernard Landry administration, the Ahuntsic-Cartierville borough was created on January 1, 2002 together with the district of Cartierville.

Education

The Collège Ahuntsic is a CEGEP in Ahuntsic.

The Commission scolaire de Montréal (CSDM) operates French-language public schools in Ahuntsic.
 École primaire Ahuntsic

The English Montreal School Board (EMSB) operates English-language schools.

The Montreal Public Libraries Network operates the Ahuntsic library.

Noted residents
Mélanie Joly (b. 1979), MP for Ahuntsic-Cartierville, former Minister of Economic Development and Official Languages, current Canadian Minister of Foreign Affairs
Julie Payette (b. 1963), former astronaut and 29th Governor General of Canada 
Maurice Richard (1921-2000), NHL player for the Montreal Canadiens

See also 
 Village of Ahuntsic
 Garment District

References

External links
  Ahuntsic.com 
 Pictures of Ahunsic on Image Montreal IMTL.org
 

Neighbourhoods in Montreal
Ahuntsic-Cartierville
Canada geography articles needing translation from French Wikipedia